Local elections were held in Denmark on 17 November 1981. 4769 municipal council members were elected to the 1982–1985 term of office in the 275 municipalities, as well as members of the 14 counties of Denmark.

Results of regional elections
The results of the regional elections:

County Councils

Municipal Councils

References

1981
1981 elections in Denmark
November 1981 events in Europe